Brothers Under the Chin is a 1924 American silent comedy film starring Stan Laurel and featuring James Finlayson.

Cast
 Stan Laurel
 Ena Gregory
 James Finlayson
 Noah Young
 William Gillespie
 Sammy Brooks
 Jack Ackroyd
 Eddie Baker
 Fred Karno Jr.
 John B. O'Brien

See also
 List of American films of 1924

References

External links

1924 films
American silent short films
American black-and-white films
1924 comedy films
1924 short films
Films directed by Ralph Ceder
Silent American comedy films
American comedy short films
1920s American films